Mark Philippoussis won in the final 6–2, 6–1 against Jiří Novák.

Seeds
A champion seed is indicated in bold text while text in italics indicates the round in which that seed was eliminated.

  Jiří Novák (final)
  Martin Verkerk (second round)
  Mark Philippoussis (champion)
 n/a
  Nicolas Kiefer (second round)
  Hyung-Taik Lee (first round)
  Magnus Norman (quarterfinals)
  John van Lottum (first round)

Draw

References
 2003 Shanghai Open Draw

Kingfisher Airlines Tennis Open
2003 ATP Tour